Algoma is a town in Pontotoc County, Mississippi.  The population was 590 at the 2010 census.

Algoma is a Native American word meaning "vale of flowers".

Geography

Climate
The climate in this area is characterized by hot, humid summers and generally mild to cool winters.  According to the Köppen Climate Classification system, Algoma has a humid subtropical climate, abbreviated "Cfa" on climate maps.

Demographics
As of the census of 2000, there were 508 people, 203 households, and 156 families residing in the town. The population density was 77.2 people per square mile (29.8/km). There were 222 housing units at an average density of 33.7 per square mile (13.0/km). The racial makeup of the town was 77.17% White, 21.65% African American, and 1.18% from two or more races. Hispanic or Latino of any race were 2.36% of the population.

There were 203 households, out of which 33.5% had children under the age of 18 living with them, 61.6% were married couples living together, 13.8% had a female householder with no husband present, and 22.7% were non-families. 20.7% of all households were made up of individuals, and 9.4% had someone living alone who was 65 years of age or older. The average household size was 2.50 and the average family size was 2.90.

In the town, the population was spread out, with 25.0% under the age of 18, 9.3% from 18 to 24, 29.7% from 25 to 44, 21.5% from 45 to 64, and 14.6% who were 65 years of age or older. The median age was 36 years. For every 100 females, there were 88.8 males. For every 100 females age 18 and over, there were 85.9 males.

The median income for a household in the town was $32,333, and the median income for a family was $38,250. Males had a median income of $24,625 versus $18,750 for females. The per capita income for the town was $13,213. About 10.6% of families and 15.0% of the population were below the poverty line, including 15.4% of those under age 18 and 37.7% of those age 65 or over.

Education
The town of Algoma is served by the Pontotoc County School District.

Algoma Cross Tie Festival
The first weekend in October Algoma has its annual "Algoma Cross Tie Festival". This festival is open for all people with live local music, auction, car and tractor show, and selling booths. The Cross-Tie Festival was originally begun in reference to the H. B. Owen Cross-Tie Factory. It was owned by Hardiman Brackett Owen in Algoma, Pontotoc Co., MS. The factory was one of the south's largest industries. Algoma still celebrates with "The Cross-Tie Festival" each year.

Notable people
 Leroy Foster, blues musician.

References

Towns in Pontotoc County, Mississippi
Towns in Mississippi
Towns in Tupelo micropolitan area